Rated G is the third album by the 5th Ward Boyz, released on November 28, 1995 through Rap-a-Lot Records.

Producer Mike Dean, who had produced the group's previous two albums, returned to produce the album with the three members of the 5th Ward Boyz co-producing the album. N.O. Joe, who also produced the group's first two albums did not contribute to this album.

Rated G peaked at 189 on the Billboard 200 and 35 on the Top R&B/Hip-Hop Albums, their lowest peak position on either chart. Despite the album's lack of commercial success, the album was met with positive reviews. Allmusic gave the album 4.5 stars out of a possible 5, saying "Rated G remains enjoyable. It is the work of talented, but not inspired, imitators and will do if The Chronic and Doggystyle are sounding stale".

Track listing
"Dirty"- 4:44  
"Concrete Hell"- 5:58  
"Wake Up"- :41  
"Situations"- 5:08  
"Fifth Ward"- 4:43  
"The Streets"- 3:49  
"My Life"- 1:17  
"Your Life"- 5:54  
"Death Is Calling"- 6:14 (featuring Flesh-n-Bone, 3D and Wildchild)
"Raising Cain"- 5:24  
"Swing Wide"- 4:44 (featuring UGK)
"Busta Free"- 5:51  
"One Night Stand"- 3:50  
"Step into My Hood"- 4:54 (featuring Daddy Lo, Gotti, Kaos, Mr. Slimm and Nickelboy)

Samples
"One Night Stand"
"Hit and Run" by The Bar-Kays

Charts

References 

1995 albums
Albums produced by Mike Dean (record producer)
5th Ward Boyz albums
Rap-A-Lot Records albums
Virgin Records albums